Geroder Eller is a river of Thuringia, Germany. At its confluence with the Weilroder Eller near Zwinge, the Eller is formed.

See also
List of rivers of Thuringia

Rivers of Thuringia
Rivers of Germany

de:Eller (Rhume)#Quellflüsse